The Navalinga temple is a cluster of Hindu temples built in the 9th century, during the reign of King Amoghavarsha I or his son Krishna II of the Rashtrakuta Dynasty. Built in the South Indian dravida style, each of the nine temples in the cluster has a linga, the universal symbol of Hindu God Shiva, and hence the name Navalinga (lit nine lingas).

General plan

A clusters of temples, the Navalinga group appears to have been placed asymmetrically, without any particular order. Despite being constructed from inferior quality sandstone, the decorative finish is rich, though much of it is lost due to degradation of the shrine walls. Each of the shrines has a South Indian style shikhara (superstructure). The ensemble has four mantapas (hall) in all, three of which are in a line going east-west and open to the shrines. Each of the shrines has a Shiva linga in the sanctum, though the lintel above the entrance has an image of Gajalakshmi, the consort of God Vishnu.

Sculpture

The pillars in the halls are of better quality than seen at Pattadakal, indicating an advancement of this art from the previous centuries. Architraves were popular and a very good example has survived and has two makaras (mythical beasts) with circular scales and florid tails. The temple complex has two well preserved old-Kannada inscriptions. Fifteen inscriptions are found in the town in all which mostly date from 1005 CE to 1186 CE, though a few from the Vijayanagara period also exist. The inscriptions mention grants to temples of various Hindu goddesses such as Chamundi, Ganga, Sarasvati, Kalikadevi and Mahamayi as well as God Mallikarjuna. It is proposed that the Navalinga temples may have originally been consecrated in honor of these goddesses.

Notes

References

External links

9th-century Hindu temples
Hindu temples in Koppal district
Shiva temples in Karnataka